The David River is a tributary of the East shore of the Yamaska River. It flows north-east on the South Shore of the St. Lawrence River, in Quebec, Canada, in the municipalities of:
 Saint-Eugène, Saint-Edmond-de-Grantham, Saint-Guillaume who are part of the Drummond Regional County Municipality, in the administrative region of Centre-du-Québec;
 Saint-David in the regional county municipality (MRC) Pierre-De Saurel, in the administrative region of Montérégie.

In addition to the villages crossed by the course of the river, the economic vocation of this hydrographic slope is mainly agricultural, and forestry for certain areas.

Geography 

The main neighboring hydrographic slopes of the David River are:
 North side: Saint-François River;
 East side: Saint-François River, Saint-Germain River;
 South side: Noire River;
 West side: Yamaska River.

The David River takes its source from agricultural streams draining the territory of the municipality of Saint-Eugène. This headland is located between the village of Saint-Eugène and that of Saint-Germain-de-Grantham, north of highway 20 and west of Drummondville.

Upper course of the river (segment of )

From highway 20, the David River flows over:
  north in an agricultural zone, up to a country road;

Lower course of the river (segment of )

From Route 224, the David River flows over:

Toponymy 

Formerly, this watercourse was designated "Rivière Saint-David".

The toponym “Rivière David” has been known since at least 1690 to designate this watercourse. The cartographer Joseph Bouchette, indicates this toponym on the map of Lower Canada, 1815. The "Dictionary of rivers and lakes of the province of Quebec (1914)" also indicates this toponym.

This toponym evokes the life work of Jacques David (Trois-Rivières, 1657 - Boucherville, 1708); the latter worked as a beaver trapper in this area.

The toponym "Rivière David" was officially registered on December 5, 1968, at the Commission de toponymie du Québec.

References

See also 
 List of rivers of Quebec

Rivers of Montérégie
Pierre-De Saurel Regional County Municipality
Rivers of Centre-du-Québec
Drummond Regional County Municipality